Meniko is a village in the Nicosia District of Cyprus. Located in the centre of the town is the Greek Orthodox church, dedicated to the martyrs St Kyprianos and St Youstina. The community celebrates this church's Feast Day yearly on 2 October.

References

Communities in Nicosia District